Barter Kings is an American reality television series on A&E in the United States. The series premiered on June 12, 2012. It features Antonio Palazzola and Steve McHugh as they trade items for better items without any currency exchange. Antonio has Tourette syndrome, which complicates his negotiations. Kendall-Leigh Neuner who is also part of the team, runs the building office and calls them with a lead. Diamond Dave also works at their shop.

On December 12, 2012, A&E announced that the series had been renewed for a six episode second season and the series would be expanded to an hour format. On July 25, 2013, A&E announced that the third season would premiere on August 6, 2013, and consist of eight episodes. In 2014, the show was canceled due to low ratings.

Timeline

Episodes

Season 1 (2012)

Season 2 (2013)

Season 3 (2013)

References

External links
 

2010s American reality television series
2012 American television series debuts
2013 American television series endings
A&E (TV network) original programming